The Mortuaries (Bangor, &c.) Abolition Act 1713 (13 Ann c 6) was an Act of the Parliament of Great Britain.

This Act is 12 Ann Stat 2 c VI in common printed editions.

The whole Act, being an enactment which, as respects England and Wales, was rendered obsolete by the Law of Property Act 1922, was repealed for England and Wales on 1 January 1926.

Title
The title, from "and for confirming" to end of title, was repealed by section 1 of, and the Schedule to, the Statute Law Revision Act 1887.

Section 1
This section, from "the said proviso" to "repealed annulled and void and", was repealed by section 1 of, and the Schedule to, the Statute Law Revision Act 1887.

References

Great Britain Acts of Parliament 1713